Elizabeth Whitehead may refer to:
 Elizabeth Whitehead (artist) (1854–1934) English painter
 Elizabeth Augustus Whitehead (1928–1983) American archaeologist and philanthropist